is Japanese for Thujopsis, a type of evergreen tree. It may refer to:

Book 
 Asunaro Hakusho, a manga series by Fumi Saimon.
 Asu-Naro  , an organization from the video game Your Turn To Die. (YTTD for short).

Organization 
 Asunaro, an imaginary youth organization in the novel Kibō no Kuni no Exodus by Ryū Murakami.
 ASUNARO: Action for Youth Rights of Korea, youth rights organization in South Korea, comes from the aforesaid novel.

Music 
 Asunaro, a Japanese J-pop band.
 "Asunaro", a 2008 single by SunSet Swish.
 "Asunaro", a 2011 single by Kenichi Suzumura.
 "Asunaro", a song by Tsunenori from their 2009 album Promising.